A congregation is a large gathering of people, often for the purpose of worship.

Congregation may also refer to:

Church (congregation), a Christian organization meeting in a particular place for worship
Congregation (Roman Curia), an administrative body of the Catholic Church
Congregation for Bishops
Congregation for the Causes of Saints
Sacred Congregation of Rites
Religious congregation, a religious institute of the Catholic Church in which simple vows are taken
Congregation (group of houses), a subdivision of some religious institutes in the Catholic Church
Qahal, an Israelite organizational structure often translated as congregation
Congregation (university), an assembly of senior members of a university
 The general audience in a ward in The Church of Jesus Christ of Latter-day Saints

Music 
 The Congregation (band), an English pop group, sold in the US and Canada as The English Congregation
 Congregation (The Afghan Whigs album)
"Congregation", the title song from the album
 Congregation (Kerbdog album)
 The Congregation (Johnny Griffin album)
 The Congregation (Leprous album)
 "Congregation" (song), by Foo Fighters

See also 
 Congregate (disambiguation)
 Congregational church